Korlahalli is a village in the Mundargi taluk of Gadag district in the Indian state of Karnataka. Korlahalli is located south to district headquarters Gadag and Taluka headquarters Mundargi.

Demographics
Per the 2011 Census of India, has a total population of 3336; of whom 1684 are male and 1652 female.

Importance
Korlahalli is famous for the ancient Korlahalli Fort located in the village.

See also
Tippapura
Mundargi
Gadag
Koppal

References

External links
 http://www.gadag.nic.in

Villages in Gadag district